Stadionul Treapt is a multi-purpose stadium in Horezu, Romania. It is currently used mostly for football matches, is the home ground of Flacăra Horezu and holds 2,000 people (1,500 on seats).

References

External links
Stadionul Treapt at soccerway.com
Stadionul Treapt at europlan-online.de

Football venues in Romania
Sport in Vâlcea County
Buildings and structures in Vâlcea County